The 2007 Warsaw Snooker Tour was a non-ranking snooker tournament that took place between 16–17 June 2007 at the Torwar Hall in Warsaw, Poland. This was the curtain raiser for the World Series of Snooker which started the next season.

Mark Selby won in the final 5–3 against reigning world champion John Higgins.

Players

Professionals:
  John Higgins
  Steve Davis
  Graeme Dott
  Mark Selby
Wild-cards:
  Rafal Jewtuch
  Marcin Nitschke
  Jaroslaw Kowalski
  Krzysztof Wrobel

Main draw

Century Breaks

 120  Steve Davis
 109  John Higgins
 101  Marcin Nitschke

References

2007
Snooker non-ranking competitions
2007 in snooker
Warsaw Snooker Tour